Francisco Javier López may refer to:
Javier López (general) (1792–1836), Argentine soldier and several times governor of Tucumán Province
Francisco Javier López Alfaro (born 1962), retired Spanish footballer 
Francisco Javier López Álvarez (born 1959), Spanish socialist politician
Francisco Javier López Castro (born 1964), retired Spanish footballer
Francisco Javier López Díaz (born 1988), Spanish footballer
Francisco Javier López García (born 1950), retired Spanish footballer
Francisco Javier López (hurdler, born 1989) (born 1989), Spanish hurdler
Francisco Javier López (hurdler, born 1973), Spanish hurdler
Francisco Javier López Peña (1958–2013), ETA member